The 2022 TAB New Zealand Darts Masters was the second staging of the tournament by the Professional Darts Corporation, and the sixth entry in the 2022 World Series of Darts. The tournament featured 16 players (eight PDC players and eight regional qualifiers) and was held at the Globox Arena in Hamilton, New Zealand on 26–27 August 2022.

Michael van Gerwen was the defending champion after defeating Raymond van Barneveld 8–1 in the 2019 final. However, he was defeated by Jonny Clayton 3–6 in the quarter-finals.

Gerwyn Price won his first World Series title (excluding the World Series Finals in 2020) after beating Clayton 8–4 in the final.

Prize money
The total prize fund remained at £60,000.

Qualifiers
The PDC announced 6 of the 8 players who have been their representatives at the event on 11 April 2022, including Fallon Sherrock, who was denied her chance to appear on the 2020 World Series of Darts circuit, owing to the COVID-19 pandemic. On 30 May 2022, it was announced that Jonny Clayton and Joe Cullen would complete the field of PDC representatives.

On 27 July, it was announced that  had withdrawn from the three Oceania events for medical reasons, and so was replaced by the current World Series Order of Merit leader .

The seeding are based on the World Series Order of Merit following the first 5 events.

  (semi-finals)
  (quarter-finals)
  (semi-finals)
  (quarter-finals)
  (champion)
  (runner-up)
  (quarter-finals)
  (first round)

The Oceanic qualifiers consisted of their three PDC Tour Card holders (Damon Heta, Simon Whitlock and Gordon Mathers), plus the top two on the DPNZ Order of Merit, the two New Zealand players who won the DPNZ qualifiers, along with one Australian player from the DPA qualifier.

Draw

References

New Zealand Darts Masters
New Zealand Darts Masters
World Series of Darts
New Zealand Darts Masters